Carlos Humberto Cabrera Polo (born November 28, 1973 in Neiva, Huila) is a retired male road racing cyclist from Colombia, who became a professional rider in 1996.

Career

1994
1st in General Classification Vuelta a Chiriquí (PAN)
1995
1st in Stage 10 Vuelta a Colombia, Armenia (COL)
1996
1st in Stage 5 Vuelta a Colombia, Puerto Boyacá (COL)

References
 
 Profile

1973 births
Living people
Colombian male cyclists
Vuelta a Colombia stage winners
People from Huila Department